Anabelle is a feminine given name. Notable people with the name include:

 Anabelle Langlois (born 1981), Canadian pairs figure skater
 Anabelle Prawerman (born 1963), French beach volleyball player
 Anabelle Rodriguez, Puerto Rican lawyer

See also
 Anabel (disambiguation)
 Anabel, given name
 Annabel (disambiguation)
 Annabelle (given name)

Feminine given names
French feminine given names